The Guerreran leopard frog (Lithobates omiltemanus) is a species of frog in the family Ranidae endemic to the Sierra Madre del Sur in Guerrero, Mexico.

Guerreran leopard frog inhabits montane forests at around  elevation. It breeds in streams.

References

Lithobates
Endemic amphibians of Mexico
Fauna of the Sierra Madre del Sur
Taxonomy articles created by Polbot
Amphibians described in 1900
Taxa named by Albert Günther